Aviron Bay (or Oar Bay) is natural bay on the island of Newfoundland in the province of Newfoundland and Labrador, Canada. The Friar, a castellated rock, is located between Aviron Bay and Cul-de-sac bay.

References

Bays of Newfoundland and Labrador
Fjords of Newfoundland and Labrador